The office of Governor of Bihar and Orissa Province was created in 1920. Bihar had been a part of Bengal since 1756, and Orissa had been so since 1803. The two were separated from Bengal to form the province of Bihar and Orissa Province in 1912, initially governed under the authority of a Lieutenant-Governor. The offices were separated in 1936.

The following list is derived from the Oxford Dictionary of National Biography.

Lieutenant governors of Bihar and Orissa Province
1912-1915: Sir Charles Stuart Bayley
1915-1918: Sir Edward Albert Gait
1918: Sir Edward Vere Levinge (acting)
1918-1920: Sir Edward Albert Gait

Governors of Bihar and Orissa Province
1920 - 1921: Satyendra Prasanna Sinha, 1st Baron Sinha
1921 - 1922: Havilland Le Mesurier (acting)
1922 - 1927: Sir Henry Wheeler
1927 - 1932: Sir Hugh Lansdown Stephenson
1932 - 1936: Sir James David Sifton

See also
List of governors of Bihar
List of governors of Odisha
Governor (India)

References